USTP may refer to:

University of São Tomé and Príncipe, a university in São Tomé and Príncipe
University of Science and Technology of Southern Philippines, a state university in the Philippines
University System of Taipei, a university alliance in Taiwan
United States Transhumanist Party
United States Taxpayers Party, the former name of the United States Constitution Party.